Mount Wever is a mountain which is a northern outlier of Du Toit Mountains, rising to about 1,700 m south of Beaumont Glacier and 13 nautical miles (24 km) southwest of Dietz Bluff, on the Black Coast, Palmer Land. Named by Advisory Committee on Antarctic Names (US-ACAN) in 1988 from a proposal by P.D. Rowley of United States Geological Survey (USGS). Named after Hein E. Wever, British Antarctic Survey (BAS) geologist, member of a joint BAS-USGS field party to the Black Coast, 1986–87.

Mountains of Palmer Land